Juliana Gaviria Rendon (born 31 March 1991) is a Colombian track cyclist, born in La Ceja.  At the 2012 Summer Olympics, she competed in the Women's team sprint, women's keirin, and Women's sprint. She also competed in the women's sprint at the 2016 Summer Olympics.  She is the elder sister of track and road cyclist Fernando Gaviria. She is married to fellow track cyclist Fabián Puerta.

Major results

2011
Pan American Road and Track Championships
2nd Team sprint (with Martha Bayona)
2012
Pan American Road and Track Championships
2nd 500m time trial
3rd Team sprint (with Diana García)
Track Cycling World Cup
1st Keirin, Round 1, Cali
3rd Team sprint, Round 1, Cali (with Martha Bayona)
2013
Pan American Road and Track Championships
1st Team Sprint (with Martha Bayona)
2nd 500 metre time trial
2nd Sprint
2nd Keirin
1st Sprint, Los Angeles Grand Prix
Copa Cobernador de Carabobo
3rd Sprint
3rd Keirin
2014
Pan American Track Championships
1st  Team Sprint (with Diana Maria Garcia Orrego)
2nd  500m Time Trial
South American Games
1st  Keirin
2nd  Sprint
2nd  Team Sprint (with Diana Maria Garcia Orrego)
2015
Copa Cuba de Pista
1st Sprint
1st Team Sprint (with Diana Maria Garcia Orrego)
1st 500m Time Trial
3rd Keirin
Pan American Track Championships
2nd  Sprint
2nd  Team Sprint (with Martha Bayona
2nd  500m Time Trial
Pan American Games
3rd  Keirin
3rd  Sprint
3rd  Team Sprint (with Diana Maria Garcia Orrego)

2016
Pan American Track Championships
2nd  Keirin
2nd  Team Sprint (with Martha Bayona
3rd  500m Time Trial
3rd Team Sprint, GP von Deutschland im Sprint (with Martha Bayona)

References

References

Colombian female cyclists
Living people
Olympic cyclists of Colombia
Cyclists at the 2011 Pan American Games
Cyclists at the 2012 Summer Olympics
Cyclists at the 2015 Pan American Games
Cyclists at the 2016 Summer Olympics
Cyclists at the 2019 Pan American Games
Colombian track cyclists
1991 births
Sportspeople from Antioquia Department
Pan American Games medalists in cycling
Pan American Games silver medalists for Colombia
Pan American Games bronze medalists for Colombia
South American Games gold medalists for Colombia
South American Games silver medalists for Colombia
South American Games medalists in cycling
Competitors at the 2014 South American Games
Medalists at the 2011 Pan American Games
Medalists at the 2015 Pan American Games
Medalists at the 2019 Pan American Games
21st-century Colombian women
Competitors at the 2010 Central American and Caribbean Games